Tiilike is a settlement in Setomaa Parish, Võru County in southeastern Estonia.

References

Villages in Võru County